Mayrung is a community in the central part of the Riverina about 45 kilometres east of Pretty Pine and 35 kilometres north-east of Deniliquin.

The Wiradjuri Aborigines, who inhabited the district prior to white settlement, called it 'Carawatha', which is thought to mean 'place of pines'.  Mayrung is situated within the Berriquin Irrigation Area which supplies wool, wheat, fat lambs, rice, dairy products, vegetables, cereals, cattle and pigs.

References

Towns in the Riverina
Towns in New South Wales